Ellen Malos (born Ellen Scarlett, 1937) is an Australian scholar and activist associated with Bristol Women's Aid, and a key figure in Bristol's Women's Liberation Movement.

Life 
Malos was born in Ballarat, Victoria, Australia in 1937. She was the first of five children. Her father was a long time socialist, glazier and decorator and her mother had made knitwear. At primary and Sunday school she discovered a love of books.

She committed to teach in order to obtain a scholarship. She studied English and History at Melbourne University. She wrote a prize-winning thesis about the novelist Patrick White. She had to take up supply teaching as she was discriminated against because she was married. Her husband lost his job because her was a socialist. She studied for a masters degree and he completed his doctorate.

In 1962 she came to the UK with her husband and two year old son. She started a doctorate but had to abandon it as her supervisor that it unbelievable that a woman would try and get a Ph.D while she had a child to care for. In 1969 she was living in Bristol when the first women's group was formed. In 1973 she gave over the basement of her house in Bristol to become the city's first women's centre.

The British Library have recorded an oral library from her. In 1971 she remembers how a man who spoke at a Women's Liberation Movement meeting of "fighting for Women's Liberation all my life" but condemning lesbians, was dragged off the platform.

In 1990, Gill Hague and Ellen Malos founded a Violence Against Women Research Group. This would become the Centre for Gender and Violence Research at the University of Bristol. In 2019 Professor Hague was awarded a CBE for her contribution to combating violence against women.

In 2007 Next Link, a British domestic abuse support service, named their Women's Safe House "Ellen Malos House" to record her contribution.

The National Lottery funded "Feminist Archive South" to hire a part-time archivist to catalogue Malos's archives. Her archives, which cover an important period of Bristol Women's history, are now part of the Special Collections at the University of Bristol.

Private life 
She married a fellow socialist John Malos, an Australian of Greek heritage.

Publications

References 

1937 births
Living people
People from Ballarat
Australian scholars
People from Bristol
Women's rights activists